is a former Japanese football player. He played for Japan national team.

Club career
Yamada attended Toin Gakuen High School, where he led the school to the final four in the National Championship. Played at Komazawa University before turning professional where he won a variety of different national titles, including the gold medal for Japan at the 1995 Summer Universiade.

He turned professional in 1997, playing for Verdy Kawasaki (later Tokyo Verdy) in the then-fledgling J1 League. He played as right side-back and midfielder. Yamada stayed with Verdy for the next eight years, clocking up almost 300 appearances for the club. He was one of the iconic players of J1 League's early years, known for his physical and charismatic strength on the field. The supporters' group honored him with the name of "Mr. Verdy" when he served as Verdy's captain for three years. He was also nicknamed "The Terminator", due to his combative style.

He moved to Cerezo Osaka for the 2006 season, but never fully settled with the club. In December 2006, Yamada surprised the Australian football community by arriving unannounced for a trial with Adelaide United. However, in January, 2007, Adelaide United signed with a Brazilian attacking midfielder Diego Walsh from Miami FC who had a more advanced visa status meaning Walsh was likely to be available sooner to play for Adelaide United.

From Australia, Yamada flew to the United States for an invitational tryout with several Major League Soccer clubs, including New England Revolution, but was not offered a contract. After returning to Japan, Yokohama FC of the J.League immediately announced its interest towards Yamada and signed him on 3 June 2007. Yamada served as captain for the 2008 season.

For the 2009 season, Yamada transferred to Sagan Tosu due to the head coach Yasuyuki Kishino's strong recruitment. On January 1, 2010, Yamada signed with FC Tampa Bay (later Tampa Bay Rowdies) for their 2010 inaugural team roster. He became the first Japanese player to serve as co-captain in USSF Division 2. Yamada re-signed with Tampa Bay, now playing in the North American Soccer League, on December 27, 2010.

Yamada remained with Tampa Bay through the 2011 season. On October 5, 2011, the club announced that Yamada would return for the 2012 season.  It was the second straight season Yamada scored the game-winner in the home opener. Started all 28 regular season matches and 2 post-season matches... Played in all 2,520 regular season minutes, the most in the NASL, and won the NASL Soccer Bowl 2012, he was also selected to the NASL 2012 Best XI.  Yamada continued to play for Tampa Bay for the 2013 season where he started in 22 matches in NASL season. Played in 1966 minutes and played in 100th official match for Rowdies on August 24, 2013. On February 10, 2014, the club announced that Yamada will return for the 2014 season as the club's longest tenured player. He left the club end of 2014 season.

He returned to Japan in 2015 and he joined FC Imabari in July. He moved to Nara Club in 2016 and played until end of the season. He returned to FC Imabari in August 2017. He retired in November 2017.

National team career
Yamada was the world champion for the 1995 Summer Universiade.

In December 2003, he was selected Japan national team for 2003 East Asian Football Championship. At this tournament, on December 7, he debuted against Hong Kong. He was also selected Japan for 2004 Asian Cup. Although he did play in the match, Japan won the champions. He played as defensive midfielder. He played 4 games for Japan until 2004.

Playing style
The organizer on the pitch with his computerized accurate short, and long passes. He is a utility player as a midfielder, and defender, who is also capable both on the flank and middle. Yamada is also a hard nose player to go tight, and tough against whoever he is matching up with. Also, equipped with sharp overlaps to score when needed. Natural leader on and off the field who served as captain in three clubs.

Club statistics

National team statistics

Honors and awards

Tampa Bay Rowdies
North American Soccer League:
 Champion (1) 2012

Personal
 2010: Co-Captain of FC Tampa Bay
 2008: Captain of Yokohama FC
 2002-2005: Captain of Tokyo Verdy

Club
 2012: NASL Best XI
 2005: J.League XEROX Super Cup Champion
 2004: J.League Emperor's Cup Champion
 2004: AFC Asian Cup Champions 
 1996: All-Japan University Best 11
 1995:	Universiade Fukuoka (World University Games), Japanese College National Team – World Champion (Gold Medal)
 1995:	All-Japan University Best 11
 1993:	All-Japan High School Select Team

International
 2004 Asian Cup (Champion)

References

External links
 
 Japan National Football Team Database
 
 

1974 births
Living people
Komazawa University alumni
Association football people from Tokyo
Japanese footballers
Japan international footballers
J1 League players
J2 League players
Japan Football League players
Tokyo Verdy players
Cerezo Osaka players
Yokohama FC players
Sagan Tosu players
FC Imabari players
Nara Club players
Japanese expatriate footballers
Expatriate soccer players in the United States
North American Soccer League players
USSF Division 2 Professional League players
Tampa Bay Rowdies players
Japanese expatriate sportspeople in the United States
2004 AFC Asian Cup players
AFC Asian Cup-winning players
Association football defenders
Association football midfielders